Pushkaram is an Indian festival dedicated to worshiping of rivers. It is also known as Pushkaralu (in Telugu), Pushkara (in Kannada) or Pushkar.

It is celebrated at shrines along the banks of 12 major sacred rivers in India, in the form of ancestor worship, spiritual discourses, devotional music and cultural programmes. The celebration happens annually, once in 12 years along each river. Each river is associated with a zodiac sign, and the river for each year's festival is based on which sign Jupiter is in at the time. Due to regional variations, some of the zodiac signs are associated with multiple rivers.

Tradition 

According to a legend mentioned in astrology treatises such as Jataka Parijata (1426), a Brahmin was granted a boon from Shiva after severe penance. The boon was that he would be able to live in water and purify the holy rivers. The Brahmin came to be known as Pushkara ("the one who nourishes"). On a request from Bṛhaspati (Jupiter), he decided to enter one of the 12 sacred rivers when Bṛhaspati traveled from one zodiac sign to another.

The rivers 

Each river is associated with a zodiac sign, and the river for each year's festival is based on which zodiac sign the planet Jupiter (Bṛhaspati) is in at that time. There are periods when Jupiter is in retrograde motion, resulting in entry into the same Zodiac sign twice in a year. On such occasions, the second entry of Jupiter is reckoned for celebrating the first part of the festival.

The Pushkaram tradition is not mentioned in the early Hindu texts; it is part of the medieval Hindu astrological lore. Therefore, the names of 12 rivers may vary depending on the regional traditions. For example, in Maharashtra, Bhima is associated with Scorpio sign, while in Tamil Nadu, Tamraparni is associated with it. The sacred rivers include:

Celebrations 

Pushkaram celebrations include reverence of ancestors, spiritual discourses, devotional music and cultural programmes. The devotees engage in activities such as snana (bath in the river), dāna (charity), japa (recitation of mantras), archana and dhyana (meditation).

Theoretically, the festival lasts as long as Jupiter remains in the corresponding zodiac sign (generally, for one year). However, it draws major crowds only during the first 12 days. The first 12 days when the Jupiter enters the zodiac sign and the last 12 days when it exits the zodiac sign are considered as most auspicious. A dip in the sacred river is believed to erase all sins. The first twelve days are known as Adi Pushkaram, and the last twelve days are called Anthya Pushkaram. It is believed that during the above period of twenty-four days, "Pushkar", imbued with the power to make any river holy, will travel with Jupiter as Jupiter moves from one Zodiac house to another. Planets that fall in the "Pushkara navamsa" or "Puskara bhaga" of a birthchart are considered to be very beneficial and auspicious in jyotish astrology. 

In Telugu-speaking states of Andhra Pradesh and Telangana, Pushkaralu are celebrated for Godavari, Krishna, Tungabhadra, Pranahita and Bhima (near Bhima-Krishna Sangam) rivers. The major towns and cities to easily reach out by train and extensive bus services for pushkaralu in Telugu states are Godavari: Rajahmundry (Airport also), Bhadrachalam, Mancherial, Basara; Krishna: Vijayawada/Amaravati (Airport also), Nagarjuna Sagar, Srisailam, Beechupalli, Repalle; Tungabhadra: Mantralayam, Kurnool, Alampur; Pranahita: Kaleswaram-Sironcha (of Maharashtra), Korisini, and Vemanpally; Bhima: Khalhalli. All these places can be reached by direct bus services from Hyderabad and all local district headquarters. 

In Tamil Nadu, Pushkaram is celebrated in Tamraparni River when Jupiter is in Scorpio. In the four places where River Tamraparni flows from south to north, Banathirtham, Papanasam, Thirupudaimaruthur and Sinthupoondurai, the festival is celebrated in accordance with tradition. The Tamraparni temple at Suthamalli is also a place of religious celebration during the Pushkaram year.

See also 
Kumbh Mela
Godavari Maha Pushkaram
Krishna Pushkaram

References

External links

 Telangana Pushkaralu
 Thirulalukundram temple pushkaramela

Tungabhdra Pushkatalu

Religious festivals in India
Water and Hinduism
Hindu festivals